Jackie is a 1921 American silent drama film directed by John Ford. The film is considered to be lost.

Plot
As described in a film magazine, Jacqueline (Mason), an orphaned daughter of a famous Russian dancer, has been raised by a French woman who runs a cheap dancing school. Called Jackie for short, her foster mother contracts her to a rough, uncouth showman, Bill Bowman (Carter), who ill treats her. When Bill tries to force his way into her room, he is struck down by Benny (Stone), a cripple. Jackie and Benny go back to London where they accidentally run into Mervyn Carter (Scott), who had previously befriended Jackie. Mervyn arranges for Benny to be sent to a hospital and Jackie to a noted dancing master. She obtains a role in a London show and becomes engaged to Mervyn. Bill shows up and demands that Jackie return with him until her contract is fulfilled. She buys herself out of the contract by paying Bill 500 pounds, and eventually marries Mervyn.

Cast
 Shirley Mason as Jackie
 William Scott as Mervyn Carter
 Harry Carter as Bill Bowman
 Georgie Stone as Benny
 John Cook as Winter
 Elsie Bambrick as Millie

See also
List of lost films

References

External links

1921 films
1921 drama films
1921 lost films
American silent feature films
Silent American drama films
American black-and-white films
Films directed by John Ford
Films with screenplays by Dorothy Yost
Fox Film films
Lost American films
Lost drama films
1920s American films
1920s English-language films
English-language drama films